Lac-Beauchamp District (District 16) is a municipal electoral district in Gatineau, Quebec represented on Gatineau City Council. It is currently represented by Denis Girouard. The district is named after Lac Beauchamp, an artificial lake in this district.

The district contains the southern half of Old Gatineau, the historic downtown of the Gatineau Sector of the city. It also contains a small section of Templeton.

City councillors
Aurèle Desjardins (2001–2009)
Stéphane Lauzon (2009–2015)
Jean-François Leblanc (2016–2021)
Denis Girouard (2021–present)

Election results

2021

2017

February 28, 2016 by-election

2013

2009

2005

2001

References
2013 Election Results
2009 Election Results
2005 results
2001 results

Districts of Gatineau